Sarah T. Roberts is an American epidemiologist. She is a research public health analyst specializing in “the biological, behavioral, social and structural factors that increase the risk of HIV/STI for women and girls in sub-Saharan Africa, particularly the role of gender inequality, male engagement, and intimate partner violence, and in the design of interventions to maximize uptake of and adherence to biomedical HIV prevention strategies in women.“

Education
PhD, Epidemiology, University of Washington
MPH, Global Health, Emory University
BA, Human Biology, Brown University,

References

University of Washington School of Public Health alumni
Rollins School of Public Health alumni
Brown University alumni
American women epidemiologists
American epidemiologists
21st-century American women scientists
Year of birth missing (living people)
Living people